The Eastern Goldfields is part of the Western Australian Goldfields in the Goldfields-Esperance region of Western Australia, covering the present and former gold-mining area east of Perth.

Extent and name origin
The region encompasses the towns of Kalgoorlie, Boulder, Coolgardie, Kambalda, Southern Cross and other smaller settlements within this area. The name is derived in two parts: Eastern in relation to its location from Perth, and Goldfields as the name suggests comes from the mining of gold in the region.

Vegetation and biological survey
In the 1980s, a series of surveys were reported for the broader region.

The component areas were designated:
 Lake Johnston - Hyden
 Edjudina - Menzies
 Youanmi - Leonora
 Duketon - Sir Samuel
 Kurnalpi - Kalgoorlie
 Norseman - Balladonia
 Sandston - Sir Samuel and Leonora - Laverton
 Boorabbin - Southern Cross and Barlee - Menzies

Transport
The region was the destination of the long-running Westland overnight railway sleeper train run by Western Australian Government Railways; for decades this was the main means of travelling to the "coast" or metropolitan Perth. The Prospector is now the main railway service into this area.

Water supply
Water to the area is supplied by the Goldfields Water Supply Scheme.

Literary culture

It was the region of inspiration for a group of writers - Gavin Casey, Katharine Susannah Prichard, Henrietta Drake Brockman and others. It has been an important cultural region as far as labour history and Australian political history, with a rich worker and trade union history.

The history of the goldfields region also developed into a significant number of publications over time.

See also
Eastern Goldfields College
Ghost towns of the Goldfields of Western Australia
Kalgoorlie-Boulder Community High School
Mineral fields of Western Australia
Eumillipes persephone

References

Goldfields-Esperance
Australian gold rushes
Mining in Western Australia
Goldfields Water Supply Scheme